Montia bostockii, known by the common name Bostock's minerslettuce, is a species in the genus Montia found in Alaska and northwestern Canada.

Description
Montia bostockii is a perennial forb that flowers in the early summer. It is closely related to Montia vassilievii, and the taxa are sometimes treated synonymously. It was once considered a candidate for protection through the Endangered Species Act, but it was found to be more  abundant and widespread than thought previously.

References

bostockii
Flora of Alaska
Flora of Yukon
Flora without expected TNC conservation status